The F. League (in Japanese: "F・リーグ", officially "日本フットサルリーグ", Nihon Futtosaru Rīgu) is the top league for Futsal in Japan. The winning team obtains the participation right to the AFC Futsal Club Championship.

History
The league was formed in 2007 as a complement for the elimination tournament, (the current Puma Cup) which groups regional futsal champions into a final elimination phase.

The league operates on the sports franchise system, with no promotion or relegation of clubs. The clubs are thus expansion teams. In 2009 the number of clubs was increased from 8 to 10 with the addition of Fuchu Athletic and Espolada Hokkaido.

In F. League play, the clubs battle each other three times: once at home, once away and once in a neutral venue (generally Yoyogi National Gymnasium in Tokyo). The season runs from August to February.

An elimination league cup, the Ocean Cup is played every season by the 12 F.League teams.

2022–23 season

Participating clubs

Division 1

Division 2

Withdrawing clubs

Statistics

Champions

Most Valuable Player (MVP)

See also
Sport in Japan
Futsal in Japan
Japan Football Association (JFA)
Futsal Championship (Futsal National Open Cup)
F.League Ocean Cup (Futsal League Cup)
Women's F.League (Women's Futsal League)

Futsal national teams
Men's
Japan national futsal team
Japan national under-20 futsal team
Women's
Japan women's national futsal team

References

External links
 Official website 

Futsal competitions in Japan
Japan
Sports leagues established in 2007
2007 establishments in Japan
Futsal
Sports leagues in Japan
Professional sports leagues in Japan